Paweł Czarnota (born 14 April 1988) is a Polish chess grandmaster.

Chess career
Paweł Czarnota is six time Polish Junior Chess Championship winner in different age categories. In 2005 he won European Youth Chess Championship under the age of 18 in Herceg Novi and Rubinstein Memorial in Polanica-Zdrój. Appeared twice in the Polish Chess Championship: 10th place in Poznań (2005) and 6th place in Kraków (2006). He has also competed successfully in several Polish Team Chess Championships. In 2009 Paweł Czarnota shared 1st place in the tournament Cracovia  (Kraków) and won the Polish Student Chess Championship in Poznan.

Paweł Czarnota played for Poland in Chess Olympiads:
 In 2006, at second reserve board in the 37th Chess Olympiad in Turin (+4, =1, -3).

Personal life 
In 2013 Paweł Czarnota graduated from the University of Silesia in Katowice with degree Master of Laws. His sister Dorota Czarnota is a chess player who holds the FIDE Woman International Master (WIM) title (2005).

References

External links

1988 births
Living people
Polish chess players
Chess grandmasters
Chess Olympiad competitors
University of Silesia in Katowice alumni
People from Olkusz